"Shaka Jam" is a song by Australian R&B band Kulcha. It was released in May 1994 as the band's debut single from their first studio album, Kulcha. The song peaked at number 7 in Australia and 8 in New Zealand.

At the ARIA Music Awards of 1995, the song was nominated for ARIA Award for Highest Selling Single; losing out to "Tomorrow" by Silverchair.

Track listing
Australian CD single
 "Shaka Jam"  – 3:33
 "Shaka Jam"  – 4:09
 "Shaka Jam"  – 3:52
 "Shaka Jam"  – 6:09

Charts

Weekly charts

Year-end charts

References

1994 debut singles
1994 songs
Kulcha (band) songs